Tony Singh may refer to:

 Tony Singh (director), Indian television director, producer and actor
 Tony Singh (chef) (born 1971), chef based in Edinburgh